Musicorba, the piano duo formed by Ricardo Vieira and Tomohiro Hatta, is one of the most important piano duos in the world (in Jornal de Noticias, 2012).

In 2010, as part of the celebrations of the Treaty of Friendship, Peace and Commerce between Portugal and Japan, the pianists Ricardo Vieira (Portuguese) and Tomohiro Hatta (Japanese) joined on stage at the invitation of the respective embassies in Japan, France and Portugal. The massive adhesion on various concerts, and the warm applause of the audience, made the pianists continue to share the stage together. The duo decided to form Musicorba.

Besides the classical repertoire, the duo promotes contemporary music and the music of the countries of origin. Recent reviews of the international press, the unconditional and hearty public confirmed the duo's prominence in the international music scene (in Jornal Grande Porto, 2011).

Nomination 
Nominees for  “Best Young Artist” November 2011 - Paris, France

Nominees for  “Best Artistic Revellation” November 2012 - Paris, France

External links 
 MusicOrba official website
 Centro de Investigação & Informação da Música Portuguesa
 O Guia da Cidade Videos
 LusoPress TV
 IPCB website
 Expresso das Ilhas
 Journal Mundo Português
 CiênciaPT magazine

Japanese classical pianists
Portuguese classical pianists
Male classical pianists